Angarrick (meaning The Rock) is a hamlet in Cornwall, England, United Kingdom. It is situated three miles (5 km) north of Falmouth in the civil parish of Mylor. The hamlet is a mile north of Mylor Bridge on the hills above Restronguet Creek.

References

Hamlets in Cornwall